A moe book is a type of instructional book using cute, young-looking characters – collectively referred to as moe or bishōjo (female) and bishōnen (male) – for tutorial purposes, with some illustrated in comic book format.

History
The oldest known moe book was the Copyright and Legal Guide for Computer Users, published in September 2002.  In Moeru Eitango Moetan, published in November 2003, full visual was added. English words examples are heavily inspired by ACG, resulting in over 200,000 books sold. Later, Shuwa System, Eagle Publishing joined the moe book business.  In February 2006, Enterbrain published Moeken, which explicitly targeted fans of moe. Also, Ikaros started to publish moe books.

List of moe books and publishers

Mainichi Communications Inc.
Copyright and Legal Guide for Computer Users

SansaiBooks Co., Ltd.
Moeru Eitango Moetan
Moetan II
Moetan 3

Shuwa System Co., Ltd.
<poe-lina/>
Magical Tunnel SoftEther

Eagle Publishing
Moemoe series

JTB Publishing Inc.
Moerurubu

MicroMagazine Corporation

Core Magazine 
Moeru diet Go! Go! Moe diet!

Ikaros Publications Ltd.

Enterbrain
Moe×Diet=Moet
Moe Uranai

Eichi Publishing Inc.
Love Yoga

Online ebooks
Manga Guide to Lisp (the programming language)

See also
 User guide

Handbooks and manuals
Moe (slang)
Japanese non-fiction books